Parkersburg High School (PHS) is a secondary school located in Parkersburg, West Virginia, United States, that serves grades nine through twelve and is part of the Wood County School District. As of the 2018-2019 West Virginia Secondary School Activity Commission's high school classifications, the school has 1,739 students and the average classroom size is twenty-five. The Wood County School District has 13,746 students in 29 schools. Its partner in education is DuPont.

Parkersburg High is the second-largest populated school in the state of West Virginia (behind Cabell Midland High School in Ona, WV) and has the largest campus in West Virginia. The feeder schools contributing to this student population are Jackson Middle School, Hamilton Middle School and Van Devender Middle School.

When the current high school campus opened in 1917, the former high school building was re-established as Washington Junior High School. Previously, Washington Junior High School fed PHS as well. The Washington Jr. High School building was demolished in 1964. Washington Junior High then opened in the former Jefferson Elementary School on Plum Street, adjacent to a newly built Jefferson Elementary School. Washington Junior High closed in 1992, combining with Jefferson Elementary School to become an elementary center in 1998.

History

Parkersburg High School was one of the first high schools in the state of West Virginia. The school was founded in 1867, originally located in downtown Parkersburg. The current building housing PHS has a Tudor Style architecture with three stories. It was designed by noted Ohio architect Frank Packard (1866–1923), and built in 1917, making it one of the oldest school buildings in West Virginia. It remains the largest high school campus in the state. Later additions included Stadium Field and the Field House, a multi-story gymnasium.  It is located in the Parkersburg High School-Washington Avenue Historic District, listed on the National Register of Historic Places in 1992.

PHS continued to serve as the only high school in Parkersburg, at one point holding a  population of around three thousand students.  It was only after graduating a class of eleven hundred thirty seven (1137) students in 1965 that a second public school, Parkersburg South High School, was founded in 1967. This in turn started a rivalry between the two schools that continues to be one of the largest and most famous in the state of West Virginia. The rivalry between the two sides of Parkersburg originated much earlier in the town's history, so the rivalry between the two schools was a natural spin-off that has brought about some dramatic competition.

Planetarium

The construction of a planetarium was conducted in the 1960s through the joint efforts of the Rotary Club of Parkersburg, Corning Glass Works, the National Defense Education Act (NDEA) and the Wood County Board of Education. Cost for constructing the room and purchasing equipment was $32,770.00. It is one of the first high schools in America to have a planetarium.

Data Processing Center

During the 1965–66 school year, PHS became one of the first high schools in the United States to offer students classes in data processing and computer programming in the "new" and expanding technology. The Burroughs computer required a huge, temperature controlled room of its own, and had a memory capacity of 640 Kb—considered top-of-the-line then. It used six phone booth-sized magnetic tape readers for computations. in 1967, upon completion of the second high school, the computer center was re-located to the new building.

Notable alumni and faculty

Alumni
Joseph Albright (class of 1956), West Virginia supreme court justice
Zak Boggs, professional soccer player
Glen Gainer, Jr. (class of 1945), State Auditor of West Virginia, 1977–1993
Linda Goodman (class of 1943), astrologer
Bill Earley (class of 1938) Assistant Head Coach Notre Dame, 1946-1954
Leon Claire Metz (class of 1948), cultural historian
Greasy Neale, football coach
Mick Staton (class of 1958), West Virginia Republican politician
Gibby Welch, football player
Patsy Ramsey, (class of 1975), Miss West Virginia 1977, Mother of JonBenét Ramsey
Doug Marks, Founder of Metal Method guitar instruction
Nick Swisher (class of 1999), outfielder for the Atlanta Braves
Stephen D. Barnett (Class of 1985), Rear Admiral U.S. Navy, Commander of the Navy Region of Hawaii

Faculty
Ben Schwartzwalder, Big Reds coach, 1936–40
Bob Dutton, Big Red Wrestling Coach, 1951–1976.  Inducted into The National Wrestling Hall of Fame in 2003, and honored with their "Lifetime Service to Wrestling” award.  WV Chapter, National Wrestling Hall of Fame

Mascot, alma mater, and school colors

The nickname "Big Reds" came to PHS in 1915 with the arrival of Ralph Jones, who came from Denison University. The Big Reds of Denison were an athletic power at the time and their colors were red and white. The name was adopted by Parkersburg, as well as the school colors.

The mascot of PHS is the Big Red Indian. It was adopted in 1961.

The Alma Mater of PHS is set to the tune of the song "Spanish Chant", also known as "Spanish Hymn". This is the same song used by Ohio State University for their alma mater, and is known there as Carmen Ohio. The PHS alma mater pre-dates Ohio State's.

Music

PHS is home to musical ensembles that are regarded as some of the most successful ones in the state.  The most recognizable ensemble is the Parkersburg Big Red Band.  In addition to these groups, Parkersburg High School has a percussion ensemble, jazz ensemble, chamber choir, men's ensemble, and women's ensemble.

Choral music

The A Cappella Choir was formed in 1931 with its first director, Dr. Marie Boette (pronounced Bo-tee), after she sent some of her students to Detroit to an A cappella singing competition.  This led to the formation of West Virginia's first A Cappella Choir in 1932, as a way to present advanced music without accompaniment.  The robes are a white cotta (or surplice) worn over a red cassock, similar in form to Roman Catholic or Episcopal altar boy or chorister vestments, and have remained the same since the inception of the choir.  They were initially created by Hazel McHenry.

The choir is best known for its annual Christmas Concert, which begins with "Fanfare for Christmas Day" sung in the grand hall.  The choir will then process to "O Come, O Come Emmanuel" by candlelight (originally real candles and then replaced by electronic ones).  The concert ends with the "Hallelujah Chorus" from Handel's Messiah, where all alumni come up to sing with the choir.  Finally, the choir recesses to "O Come, O Come Emmanuel" by candlelight.

The Parkersburg High School A Cappella Choir has performed for two presidents: Harry S Truman in 1949 and Lyndon B Johnson in 1966.  It also performed in Washington, D.C., in 1997.  The choir was selected as an honor ensemble for the 2000, 2002, 2005, 2018, and 2023 West Virginia Music Education Association annual conference. In April 2010, they performed in Carnegie Hall alongside OSU's choir and a few other high school and college choirs. They performed two pieces (a work by Brahms and a work by Amy Beach) under the direction of Dr. Hilary Apfelstadt.

The Chamber Choir sang at two professional basketball games, in 2004 and 2005.  They were invited to sing again in 2006.  In addition to this, they were with Parkersburg South's Chamber Choir and West Virginia University at Parkersburg's chorus in premiering "The Unknown Region" by Kenton Cole. Most recently, the Chamber Choir was selected to sing during the 2019 White House Christmas Open Houses in Washington DC.

The current choral director is Joshua A. Dubs, a graduate of Geneva College.

Due to the 2008 grade shift in Wood County Schools, a new choral organization was formed for 9th graders who were not inducted into the A Cappella Choir called the Freshman Choir.  In its first year, there were over eighty members in this organization.

All four of the schools vocal music programs are internationally awarded. The choir takes an annual competition trip and has competed in such cities as New York City, New Orleans, Toronto, Boston, Orlando, and many others. The choirs always do very well in competition, often bringing home gold 1st places in each category.

Instrumental music

The Big Red Band was first a concert band only organized in 1919 and was under the direction of C. O. Chapman.  The first Big Red Band as a marching band was organized under George Dietz in 1924.   It was all-male and women were not allowed into the band itself until 1970. The Big Red Band is the only military-style marching band in the state of West Virginia and prides themselves on being a music making organization first.

The original uniforms for the band were all white with red trim and buttoned down the middle.  They featured red capes and red navy-style dress uniform hats (similar to the ones worn by the Navy ROTC at PHS). The current uniforms have been essentially the same since at least 1955, with the only noticeable change being the crossbelts.  Originally they were just one sash crossing over the body; the current ones have two sashes (which in 1955 were worn by the field commanders) that criss-cross the band member with the right one over the left one.  The current uniforms also are made of wool and are red tops with white bottoms.  The uniform top has two sets of silver buttons, one for each side, and the uniform pants have a red stripe down each outward facing side.

The field commander's uniform has seen its share of changes also.  Originally, there were multiple field commanders/drum majors.  One wore an all red uniform with the same styled white hat, and the others wore the white uniforms that eventually became the current field commander's uniform.  The current field commander uniform was all white with a tall white hat with the 1955 set, this was changed slightly to include a red breastpiece and yellow shoulderpieces.  The crossbelts worn by them in 1955 became the current crossbelts for the band. The field commander uniform lacks a crossbelt.

The Big Red Band has its own fair share of recognition, performing at the World's Fair in 1982.  They were also in the Macy's Thanksgiving Day Parade in November 1992.  They also performed in the Kentucky Derby Pegasus Parade in 1995, and are regularly invited to participate in New Year's Day "bowl festivities."

Also, the Big Red Band won two Veterans of Foreign Wars junior band championships, one in Boston (1955) and one in Dallas (1956)  and are one of only a few groups at PHS to be able to call themselves national champions.  The band also won the Lion's Club International Band Contest four times: in Providence (year unknown), Chicago (1937), Pittsburgh (1939), and New Orleans (1941).  They performed for the National Moose Convention in 1948.  In addition, they were selected as the best band in the state in 1930 and won the tri-state band concert in 1933.  The band received the Ohio State Governor's Cup in the fall of 1991.

The concert and jazz band also traveled to New Orleans for the Heritage Festival national competition in the 2004–2005 school year, the jazz band ended up taking 2nd place nationally and the concert band 1st place.

The band has performed for Ronald Reagan and George W. Bush during their visits to Parkersburg as presidents of the United States. They also played for Queen Marie of Romania during an incidental visit to Parkersburg (this was due to a snow squall hitting the area, forcing the Queen's train to stop) in 1926.

Fine arts
With active drama, dance and forensics programs, the fine arts department at Parkersburg High School is widely recognized as one of the best and fastest growing in the state.

Drama

The Parkersburg High School drama program is split between the PHS Drama Club and Thespian Troupe #264, which work together to produce plays as the combined "PHS Players." Drama Club members work towards earning enough Thespian "points" in order to be inducted into the Troupe at a ceremony which takes place at the end of each school year. The Troupe is one of the oldest in the country, considering that there are currently over 4000 registered school and became registered with the International Thespian Society while former Broadway actor John Lee was teaching as Parkersburg High School's Director of Performing Arts in the 1960s and 70s. Other past directors include Connie Brant, Heather Gates-Rusher, Amanda Witt, and current teacher Lori Zyla.

Past PHS productions include No Exit, Dinny and the Witches, Interview, The Serpent, Comings And Goings, War, Charlie's Aunt, The Boyfriend, Box & Cox, The Acting Lesson, Shakespeare Unbound, Love Death and the Prom, The End of Civilization As We Know It, Seven Murders and It's Only Monday, A Midsummer Night's Dream, The Wizard of Oz, The Long Red Herring, Our Town, Small Actors, French Toast, The Great Pandemonium, The Empty Chair, The Crucible, Imaginary Harry, Little Shop of Horrors, A Piece of My Heart, Grease, FREAK, 4 a.m., Alice in Wonderland, Hard Candy, Night of the Living Dead, Radium Girls, Black Comedy, Damn Yankees, The Wedding Singer, Too Much Light Makes the Baby Go Blind, The Haunting of Hill House, The Insanity of Mary Gerrard, Things Fall (Meanwhile), The 25th Annual Putnam County Spelling Bee, and Once Upon a Mattress.

In 1971, under the direction of the late John Lee, Thespian Troupe #264 won best play for both the regional and state drama festival for Comings And Goings. Best actor for the regional festival for this production was Dan Strimer, who also won runner-up best actor for the WV state competition for the same play that year in Morgantown, WV. In 2009, under the direction of Amanda Witt, Thespian Troupe #264 placed in the top five schools at the West Virginia Thespian Festival in the one-act play competition against thirteen other schools statewide for their performance of Bradley Hayward's Imaginary Harry. Other awards to PHS at the 2009 Festival included the naming of Frankie Love (Harry) and Jamie Mace (Mom) as All State Cast Members and Scarlet Sheppard (Jamie) as WV Best Actress. PHS Thespians were awarded a $10,000 grant towards representing West Virginia at the International Thespian Festival in Lincoln, Nebraska in June 2009 making them State Champions. The troupe travelled and performed, and were named one of the Top Five one-acts at the International Festival.  Imaginary Harry playwright, Bradley Hayward, travelled from his home in Canada to see PHS's performance and now features videos of PHS's version on his professional website.

In 2010, under the direction of Amanda Witt, Thespian Troupe #264 again placed in the top five schools at the WV State Thespian Festival for their performance of Shirley Lauro's "A Piece of My Heart." Other awards to PHS at the 2010 Festival included the naming of Audriana Davis (Leeann) as WV Best Actress, Danielle (Steele'') as WV Best Supporting Actress and first place in Solo Musical Theatre Performance, second place in Stage Management to Meghan Handley, third place in fantasy makeup to Brittani Hill and a Best Sound Design award to Timm Romine. For her win in Solo Musical Performance, Danielle Grays was invited to compete at the International Thespian Festival in June 2010.

Under the direction of Lori Zyla, Troupe #264 has placed in the top five schools at state festival, once in 2011 and once in 2015, and continues to be competitive at the state festival.

Dance

The dance program at PHS consists of students taking dance classes for arts credits. Along with learning about the history and application of dance around the world, dance students also perform at multiple venues such as the annual Justo Lamas concerts presented for Spanish language students and the Parkersburg High School Talent shows.

Forensics

The Parkersburg High School Forensics Team consists of a Speech team and Debate team under coach Lori Zyla. Both teams travel and compete together around the state and at a "home" Tournament dubbed the Isenhart Invitational in spring. The Forensics Team sponsors various fundraisers including the Mister and Miss PHS Pageants held in April.

In 2008, three competitors from the PHS Speech Team won at the state level in their respective "events" (Original Oratory and Duo Interpretation) and a bid to compete at the Grand National  Tournament in Appleton, Wisconsin where all three did well, but did not "octofinal" or go on to place nationally. In 2009, Parkersburg High School was awarded third place overall at the State Tournament behind Wheeling Park High School and Huntington High School. At the Qualifying tournament, two PHS team members were selected as alternates for the 2009 National Tournament. Also in 2009, Senior Speech Captain Valerie Price was named PHS's first All American by the National Forensic League, the oldest and largest speech and debate honor society in the nation. All Americans are students with exceptional combined achievements in GPA, Test Scores and NFL (National Forensics League) points earned through performance at tournaments. In 2010, Parkersburg High School was awarded third place overall at the State Tournament. In 2017, six of Parkersburg High School's students qualified at the state level and went on to compete in the Catholic League Grand National Tournament in Louisville, Kentucky. They competed in Declamation, Original Oratory, Duo Interpretation, and Public Forum Debate.

Academics
Parkersburg High School consistently beats the state averages on standardized tests.

9th Grade Math 69% proficient vs state average of 61%.

10th Grade Math 60% proficient vs state average of 54%.

11th Grade Math 60% proficient vs state average of 58%.

Athletics
Parkersburg High is well known for its athletic achievements. 

Former PHS Big Red player Matt Kimes was named PHS Head Football Coach on February 22, 2022. 

As a player Kimes led the Big Reds in both rushing and receiving yards during the 1996 season. 

PHS was rated by Sports Illustrated as the #9 sports high school of all time due to its long winning traditions and graduates such as Earl "Greasy" Neale who is in the Football Hall of Fame as well as other graduates such as outfielder Nick Swisher of the New York Yankees (and formerly of the Chicago White Sox and Oakland Athletics), and Larry "Flash" Rhodes.  Parkersburg High experiences a very strong rivalry with cross-town high school Parkersburg South High School. The rivalry is recognized as one of the best in the state.
 
Following the 2010 season it was discovered PHS was voted the top football team in West Virginia for the 1918, 1919, 1921, 1922 & 1927 seasons 

The school is known as "The School of Champions" and holds twice as many state titles in athletics as any other high school in West Virginia. The football team has the 12th most victories in the United States with 827 (as of 8/20/2019). For the first time in one hundred three years of PHS football, 2007 marks the first time the team has won back to back state championships (2006 and 2007).  The boys' and girls' soccer teams are also 2006 state champions with the boys' team having won two in a row, making for a state record four state championship wins for one high school. The boys' team is also currently ranked 24th in the nation. Parkersburg High School is also famous for the achievements of its wrestling team including a 2006-07 and 2007-08 AAA State Championship of their own, tying the Wrestling team with the PHS Boys' Tennis Team, which has 21 titles, the record for the most titles for one team in West Virginia.

Former Big Red Wrestling Coach, Joe Handlan, has the record for having coached the most individual state wrestling champions in the state's history, as he has coached 51 individual state wrestling champions.

During the summer of 2008, due to the successes of the Parkersburg athletic programs, Parkersburg, West Virginia was featured on ESPN as a candidate for Titletown USA.  Parkersburg came in as the runner-up in the Titletown voting process, losing to Valdosta, Georgia.

As of November 2022, Parkersburg High School has a total of 147 West Virginia high school state championships.

See also
List of high schools in West Virginia

References

External links

 

Buildings and structures in Parkersburg, West Virginia
School buildings on the National Register of Historic Places in West Virginia
Public high schools in West Virginia
Educational institutions established in 1867
1867 establishments in West Virginia
Tudor Revival architecture in West Virginia
Gothic Revival architecture in West Virginia
Schools in Wood County, West Virginia
Frank Packard buildings
National Register of Historic Places in Wood County, West Virginia